A quilombola is an Afro-Brazilian  resident of quilombo settlements first established by escaped slaves in Brazil. They are the descendants of Afro-Brazilian slaves who escaped from slave plantations that existed in Brazil until abolition in 1888. The most famous quilombola was Zumbi and the most famous quilombo was Palmares.

Many quilombolas live in poverty.

History

In the 16th century, slavery was becoming common across the Americas, particularly in Brazil. Africans were kidnapped and shipped across the Atlantic via the Trans-Atlantic slave trade. In Brazil, most worked on sugar plantations and mines, and were brutally tortured. Some slaves were able to escape. According to oral tradition, among them was Aqualtune, a former Angolan princess and general enslaved during a Congolese war. Shortly after reaching Brazil, the pregnant Aqualtune escaped with some of her soldiers and fled to the Serra da Bariga region. It was here that Aqualtune founded a quilombo, or a colony of Quilombolas, called Palmares. Palmares was one of the largest quilombos in Brazil.

Palmares 
In the 1630s, Palmares was inherited by Aqualtune's son, Ganga Zumba, who ruled the city from a palace. The inhabitants used African style forges to make metal plows and scythes to harvest fields of corn, rice and manioc and created agricultural forests of palm and breadfruit. Palmares and other quilombos during the Quilombola's glory days were surrounded by palisades, camouflaged pits filled with deadly stakes, and paths lined with lacerating caltrops. Palmares was behind many raids of Portuguese ports and towns. Lisbon, seeing Palmares as a direct challenge to its colonial status, declared war on the Quilombolas. Twenty attacks on Palmares failed. But the constant attacks wore down Ganga Zumba, and in 1678 he agreed to stop accepting new slaves and move out of the mountains to safety. Ganga Zumba's nephew, Zumbi, saw this as betrayal and poisoned his uncle before tearing up the treaty with the Portuguese. Colonial forces continued the relentless attacks, and in the end Zumbi was unable to cope. In 1694, the Portuguese finally destroyed Palmares and killed hundreds of its citizens, ending the glory days of the Quilombolas. Zumbi and Palmares survived only as symbols of resistance.

Mola 
The Mola quilombo consisted of approximately 300 formerly enslaved people and had a high degree of political, social and military organization. Felipa Maria Aranha was the first leader of the community. The group was also led by Maria Luiza Piriá. It was organised as a republic, with democratic voting in place. Over the course of the Mola quilombo's life, it expanded to include four other similar settlements in the region and was known as the Confederação do Itapocu.  In 1895 there were still traces of the settlement to be seen; they have now disappeared. Historians, such as Benedita Pinto and Flávio Gomes, interpret the organisation of the group as an ideal model of resistance to slavery.

Recognition of Quilombolas
Other quilombos emerged during the age of Palmares and the Aqualtune Dynasty. Fleeing slaves befriended and allied with Brazilian Indigenous peoples. Today most of the Quilombola population is of mixed African-Brazilian and Indigenous ancestry. Quilombos were mainly located deep in the jungles, far from European influence, and after the fall of Palmares, all the quilombolas either went into hiding or were wiped out by Europeans. Most of the Quilombolas remained hidden so successfully it was assumed they had been destroyed or died out. They dropped farming at the risk of being discovered and continued the agricultural forest practice. The Quilombolas adopted a lifestyle that was a cross of Portuguese and various Indigenous and African cultures. Until the 1970s, the Quilombolas were mostly unknown internationally and assumed to have been entirely killed off. In 1970s, deforestation reached their lands. Loggers, assuming them to be squatters trying to steal property, forced them off their land at gunpoint stole their land. They were not recognized as surviving Quilombola peoples until the 1980s. Enraged ranchers claimed they were squatters pretending to be Quilombolas to get land. Eventually, they were accepted as Quilombolas, but ranchers still kept stealing their land. The most avid supporter of the Quilombolas was Chico Mendes, who argued for the preservation of the jungle and its Indigenous peoples, including the Quilombolas.

Quilombola land rights

In 2003, President Lula passed Decreto 4.887/2003, which recognized Quilombo communities and their claims to the land they inhabited. The decree detailed the processes of titling and demarcation of the Quilombo land. Right wing opponents filed a lawsuit which suggested that Lula's decree was unconstitutional. The ruling on the case was postponed for over 3 years, which resulted in President Temer suspending all new titles and demarcations of the lands until a ruling was made on the constitutionality of the decree. On February 8, 2018, the Brazilian Supreme Court (STF) rejected the legal action and voted in favor of Lula's decree.

Though Quilombola land rights are secured by the STF for now, the communities still face many obstacles today, like the constitutional amendment PEC 215, which has been proposed and is up for debate in Congress. Currently, the executive branch in Brazil has power to demarcate Quilombola territories. PEC 215, if passed, would give Congress exclusive authority to oversee demarcation of indigenous land. The constitutional amendment would also give Congress power over land which has already been approved for demarcation. PEC 215 could potentially take away land titles from 219 Quilombolas.

Approximately forty percent of the twelve million Africans imported to the Americas to be enslaved landed in Brazil in the late 16th century. Many enslaved Afro-Brazilians escaped bondage by running away and occupying land which led to the creation of Quilombos. Those who live in these autonomous communities are referred to as Quilombolas and for many years many Quilombolas have been struggling to keep and earn titles to their land in the face of modernization, gentrification, and oppressive regimes in Brazil.

	Legally, the Quilombolas were granted rights to their land in 1988 as the Brazilian Constitution acknowledged these communities and stated: The definitive property rights of remanescentes ["remnants"] of quilombos that have been occupying the same lands are hereby recognized, and the state shall grant them title to such lands.	According to Sue Branford and Maurício Torres, only 219 of the 2,926 Quilombos have land titles. Brazil's total Quilombo population is over 16 million. They are among the poorest people in Brazil, with a poverty rate of around 75 percent among quilombolas, compared to 25.4 percent in the general population, government data shows.

Without land titles, the quilombolas don't have access to social benefits, such as subsidized housing. But threats are also looming from illegal loggers and gold miners encroaching on quilombola land, activists have said.

On March 3, 2018, Simão Jatene, the governor of Pará, signed a document giving land titles for more than 220,000 hectares of Amazon forest to an isolated community populated by descendants of enslaved people who escaped centuries ago. However, with a new administration in office, it is likely that there will be changes to current policy regarding quilombolas. Brazil's president-elect, Jair Bolsonaro, has said: "They [quilombolas] don't do anything! I don't think they even serve for procreation anymore." In 2017, during a speech at the Hebraica club, Bolsonaro stated: "If I [become president], there won't be any money for NGOs ... You will not have a centimeter demarcated for indigenous reserves or quilombolas."

1988 Constitution: Article 68
The national black movement and the black rural communities in the northern regions of Pará and Maranhão gathered political momentum throughout the 1980s and succeeded in having quilombola land rights introduced into the 1988 Constitution in the form of Article 68. Regional and national organisations working to fight racial discrimination formed an alliance in 1986 that played an important role in the grassroots political action that resulted in Article 68. Black militants across Brazil demanded reparation and the recognition of the detrimental effects of slavery, including preventing black communities from accessing land. The Black Movement explicitly decided to make land central to their political agenda during the constitutional debates. They capitalised on the perception that there were very few quilombos and that it would thus be mainly a symbolic gesture in order to get it into the Constitution. It was assumed that any community would have to prove its direct descent from a runaway slave settlement.

Black federal representative Benedita da Silva was the main proponent in Congress of the inclusion of quilombo land rights in the new Constitution, which was drawn up after Brazil's military dictatorship ended in 1986. Article 68 stated that "definitive ownership will be recognized, and the respective title will be issued by the State, to those descendants of the maroon communities occupying their lands." Quilombo members cannot be legally evicted, except by the federal government (which has challenged at least two certified quilombos: Rio dos Macacos whose claims overlapped a Navy base and Alcântara where a space station has been built). The inclusion of quilombo communities in the Constitution was the first recognisable government action towards the reparation of historical injustice against slave descendants.

Redefinition - 2003
Throughout the second half of the 1990s and the early 2000s, hundreds of black peasant communities in Brazil began the legal process for official recognition. Despite a government attempt in 1999 to restrict the application of Article 68, there was increasing black rural mobilisation and growing criticism of the categorisation of rural black communities solely as the result of colonial social relations. In 2003, the government of President Luiz Inácio "Lula" da Silva issued Presidential Decree 4887 that categorized quilombo descendants as "self-designated ethno-racial groups who have their own historical trajectory, specific territorial relations, and a presumed black ancestry related to the historical oppression they have suffered". Through the political pressure exerted by black peasants throughout Brazil, the government established explicitly that quilombos should be defined by their being communities formed by black peasants in general, part of the present agrarian structure and contemporary society, not only by their relation to the past as runaway-descendants.

As of 2016, 294 villages have applied to be recognized as quilombos, because they were founded by escaped slaves and are mainly inhabited by their descendents. The certification process thus far has been slow, and 152 villages have been recognized as quilombos.

See also
Maroons
Quilombo

References

Further reading
Osorio & Baldi (2010) 'Supreme Court of Brazil to rule over Quilombo communities' rights to land – arguments for a protective approach'

Planas, R. (2014) Brazil's 'Quilombo' Movement May Be The World's Largest Slavery Reparations Program. Huffington Post

Redman, Paul & Renold, Jaye (2015) Freedom: Quilombo land title struggle in Brazil Film looks at two Quilombola communities, one with no land title and one benefitting from legal recognition, and examines the disparities between them plus further context.

Slavery in Brazil
Maroons (people)
People of African descent
Ethnic groups in Brazil

da:Maron
de:Quilombo
es:Negro cimarrón
fr:Marronnage
sw:Wabusinenge
lt:Maronai
nl:Marrons
ja:マルーン
pl:Morroni